Gulf Breeze is a city in Santa Rosa County, Florida. It is a suburb of Pensacola, and is in the Pensacola Metropolitan Area. The population estimate was 6,900 in 2020. Gulf Breeze is located just north of Pensacola Beach, and south of Pensacola. Gulf Breeze is on the Fairpoint Peninsula, and is bordered by Navarre to the east.

Gulf Breeze provides utility services to South Santa Rosa County and Pensacola Beach over 33 square miles. The surrounding unincorporated area is known as Greater Gulf Breeze.

Geography

Growth of the city itself is geographically restricted, surrounded by major water bodies on three sides; the eastern portion of Gulf Breeze is occupied by the Naval Live Oaks Reservation. As a result, new growth takes place east of the city limits along U.S. Highway 98.

Climate

Demographics

As of the 2010 Census, there were 5,763 people living in the city. The racial makeup of the city was 95.7% white, 0.3% black or African American, 0.6% American Indian and Alaska native, 1.4% Asian, 0.5% some other race, 1.3% two or more races, and 2.6% Hispanic or Latino, of any race.

As of the census of 2000, there were 5,665 people, 2,377 households, and 1,678 families living in the city.

There were 2,377 households, out of which 28.1% had children under the age of 18 living with them, 57.7% were married couples living together, 10.6% had a female householder with no husband present, and 29.4% were non-families. 25.3% of all households were made up of individuals, and 13.0% had someone living alone who was 65 years of age or older. The average household size was 2.36 and the average family size was 2.83.

In the city, the population was spread out, with 22.3% under the age of 18, 4.6% from 18 to 24, 22.5% from 25 to 44, 29.7% from 45 to 64, and 20.8% who were 65 years of age or older. The median age was 45 years. For every 100 females, there were 89.4 males. For every 100 females age 18 and over, there were 83.6 males.

The median income for a household in the city was $52,522, and the median income for a family was $61,661. Males had a median income of $44,408 versus $28,159 for females. The per capita income for the city was $34,688. About 3.8% of families and 4.2% of the population were below the poverty line, including 5.5% of those under age 18 and 1.2% of those age 65 or over.

Arts and culture

Points of interest 

 

In 1828 the U.S. government purchased the land encompassing the Naval Live Oaks Reservation for experimenting with acorns for the cultivation of live oaks to produce wooden ships. Before the Civil War, the wood of the live oak was the primary material of choice for shipbuilders, thus the protection and cultivation of the trees for the United States Navy was considered vital for defense in those turbulent times. To the south of Highway 98 is a visitor's center for the Gulf Islands National Seashore and several public beach areas.

Gulf Breeze Library

The Gulf Breeze Library, opened in 1971, is part of the Santa Rosa County Library System.

Education

Gulf Breeze High School
Gulf Breeze Middle School
Gulf Breeze Elementary School

Infrastructure
Gulf Breeze is served by route 61 of Escambia County Area Transit.

Notable people

 Bob Armstrong (1939-2020), professional wrestler (longtime resident)
 Doug Baldwin (born 1988), American football player
 Ashley Brown (born 1982), singer and actress
 Ben Lively (born 1992), baseball pitcher for the Cincinnati Reds
 Jason McKie (born 1980), American football player
 Frank Spellman (1922–2017), Olympic champion weightlifter
 Abigail Spencer (born 1981), actress; born and raised in Gulf Breeze
 Adrian Street (born 1940), professional wrestler (longtime resident)

See also 
 Gulf Breeze UFO incident
 Third Gulf Breeze

References

External links

 Gulf Breeze Area Chamber of Commerce

Populated places on the Intracoastal Waterway in Florida
Cities in Santa Rosa County, Florida
Cities in Pensacola metropolitan area
Cities in Florida
1875 establishments in Florida
Populated places established in 1875